James A. "Ike" Tomlinson (November 17, 1910 – March 9, 2000) was an American football, basketball, and baseball coach and college athletics administrator.  He served as the head baseball coach at Arkansas State University from 1948 to 1976, compiling a record of 363–423–7 and becoming the longest-tenured athletic coach at the school.  The school's baseball facility, Tomlinson Stadium–Kell Field, is named after him.  Tomlinson was also the head football coach at Arkansas State for season in 1945, tallying a mark of 2–4–1, and school's head basketball coach from 1944 to 1949, amassing a record of 51–69.

Head coaching record

Football

References

1910 births
2000 deaths
Arkansas State Red Wolves athletic directors
Arkansas State Red Wolves baseball coaches
Arkansas State Red Wolves football coaches
Arkansas State Red Wolves men's basketball coaches